The 1896–97 United States Senate elections were held on various dates in various states. As these U.S. Senate elections were prior to the ratification of the Seventeenth Amendment in 1913, senators were chosen by state legislatures. Senators were elected over a wide range of time throughout 1896 and 1897, and a seat may have been filled months late or remained vacant due to legislative deadlock. In these elections, terms were up for the senators in Class 3.

The Democratic Party lost seven seats, mostly to smaller third parties.

Results summary 
Senate party division, 55th Congress (1897–1899)

 Majority party: Republican (43)
 Minority party: Democratic (33)
 Other parties: Populist (5); Silver (5); Silver Republican (2)
 Total seats: 90
 Vacant: 2, later filled by 1 Republican and 1 Democrat.

Change in Senate composition

Before the elections

Result of the general elections

Beginning of the next Congress

Race summaries

Elections during the 54th Congress 
In these elections, the winners were seated during 1896 or in 1897 before March 4; ordered by election date.

Elections leading to the 55th Congress 

In these regular elections, the winners were elected for the term beginning March 4, 1897; ordered by state.

All of the elections involved the Class 3 seats.

Elections during the 55th Congress 
In these elections, the winners were elected in 1897 after March 4; ordered by date.

Maryland 

George L. Wellington was elected by an unknown margin, for the Class 3 seat.

New York 

The election in New York was held on January 19, 1897, by the New York State Legislature.  Democrat David B. Hill had been elected to this seat in 1891, and his term would expire on March 3, 1897.  At the State election in November 1895, 36 Republicans and 14 Democrats were elected for a three-year term (1896–1898) in the state senate. At the State election in November 1896, 114 Republicans and 36 Democrats were elected for the session of 1897 to the Assembly. The 120th New York State Legislature met from January 6 to April 24, 1897, at Albany, New York.

The Republican caucus met on January 14. 149 State legislators attended, and State Senator Cornelius R. Parsons (43rd D.), Ex-Mayor of Rochester, presided. The caucus nominated the Republican boss Thomas C. Platt, who had been briefly a U.S. Senator in 1881, on the first ballot.

The Democratic caucus met on January 18. 46 State legislators attended, but 5 walked out before the roll was called, after making speeches against Hill. The incumbent U.S. Senator David B. Hill was re-nominated.

Thomas C. Platt was the choice of both the Assembly and the state senate, and was declared elected. Four anti-Hill Democrats voted for Labor leader Henry George, who later the same year ran for Mayor of New York as a "Jefferson Democrat" but died a few days before the election.

Note: The votes were cast on January 19, but both Houses met in a joint session on January 20 to compare nominations, and declare the result.

Pennsylvania 

The election in Pennsylvania was held January 19, 1897. Boies Penrose was elected by the Pennsylvania General Assembly. Incumbent Republican J. Donald Cameron, who was elected in an 1877 special election and subsequently re-elected in 1879, 1885, and 1891, was not a candidate for re-election. The Pennsylvania General Assembly, consisting of the House of Representatives and the Senate, convened on January 19, 1897, to elect a new senator to fill the term beginning on March 4, 1897. The results of the vote of both houses combined are as follows:

|- bgcolor="#EEEEEE"
| colspan="3" align="right" | Totals
| align="right" | 253
| align="right" | 100.00%
|}

South Carolina 

The election in South Carolina was a unanimous election of the Democratic nominee on January 26, 1897. The Democratic primary election was held on August 26, 1896, and September 9.  The Democratic Party of South Carolina organized primary elections for the U.S. Senate beginning in 1896 and the General Assembly would confirm the choice of the Democratic voters.  Conservative Democratic Joseph H. Earle won the Democratic primary and was elected by the General Assembly for a six-year term.

In 1896, Governor of South Carolina John Gary Evans entered the first ever election in the state of South Carolina for the U.S. Senate.  He had the backing of Senator Ben Tillman and much of the farming interests in the state.  However, the farmers' movement had largely run its course and the Tillmanite reform movement had angered a considerable number of voters in the state.  Conservative Joseph H. Earle and Newberry native John T. Duncan announced their candidacy's in opposition to Governor Evans.  In the primary on August 26 Evans emerged as the frontrunner, but did not garner over 50% of the vote and was forced to face Earle in a runoff election.  Those who had voted for Duncan threw their support to Earle and it provided him with the margin he needed for victory over Evans.

See also 
 1896 United States elections
 1896 United States House of Representatives elections
 1896 United States presidential election
 54th United States Congress
 55th United States Congress

Notes

References 
 Party Division in the Senate, 1789-Present, via Senate.gov
 
 

Members of the 55th United States Congress
PROCEEDINGS OF THE CAUCUS, The New York Times, January 15, 1897
MR. HILL IS RENOMINATED, The New York Times, January 19, 1897
MANY SENATORS SELECTED; Platt Gets a Big Majority in Each House of New York's Legislature, The New York Times, January 20, 1897